Beansheaf Farm is a suburb of the town of Reading, in the English county of Berkshire.

Local government
From a local government perspective, Beansheaf Farm is outside the boundaries of the Borough of Reading. It forms part of the civil parish of Holybrook, in the neighbouring unitary authority of West Berkshire.

References

External links

West Berkshire District
Suburbs of Reading, Berkshire